The Green Ball Crew e.p., released in 1993, was the second EP released by the New Jersey punk rock band The Bouncing Souls. Five of the songs on here were re-released on the 2000 compilation disc The Bad, the Worse, and the Out of Print.

Track listing
 "Wig" – 3:34
 "Dirt" – 3:03
 "Kicked" – 3:42
 "Spank" – 2:35
 "P.M.R.C" – 3:31
 "Trapped" – 5:33
 "Hate" – 3:31

The Bouncing Souls EPs
1993 EPs
Chunksaah Records EPs